Gatacko polje is a karst field within the Gacko municipality in Bosnia and Herzegovina, spanning 57–60 km2, being ca. 24 km long and ca. 3,6 km wide, in the northwest–southeast direction. It is situated between the mountains of Bjelašnica and Lebršnik on the altitude of 930 to 1000 m. The subterranean rivers of Gračanica and Mušnica cross the field. The only larger settlement is Gacko. Near the field are the mountains and straddle of Čemerno (with sea watershed), the source of the Trebišnjica, Klinje Lake and the Sutjeska National Park. The field develops agriculture and animal husbandry.

References

External links

Safet HadžiMuhamedović (2018) Waiting for Elijah: Time and Encounter in a Bosnian Landscape. New York and Oxford: Berghahn Books. 

Karst fields of Bosnia and Herzegovina
Gacko
Herzegovina